Route 118 is a highway in Holt County.  Its eastern terminus is at U.S. Route 59 in Mound City; its western terminus is at Route 111 about six miles (10 km) west of Mound City.

Route description
Route 118 begins at an intersection with Route 111 in Holt County, heading east on a two-lane undivided road. The route heads through agricultural areas with some trees, intersecting Route P. The road passes through the community of Bigelow, where it crosses BNSF Railway's Napier Subdivision. Past Bigelow, Route 118 curves northeast through more rural areas. The road reaches Mound City, where it comes to an interchange with I-29. A short distance later, Route 118 comes to its eastern terminus at US 59.

History

Major intersections

References

118
Transportation in Holt County, Missouri